SS Meriones was a Blue Funnel Line refrigerated cargo steamship. She was launched in 1921 on the River Tyne as one of a class of 11 ships to replace many of Blue Funnel's losses in the First World War.

In 1941 the Second World War Meriones became stranded on a sandbank in the North Sea. An attempt to salvage her was disrupted by enemy air attacks, and she became a total loss.

Blue Funnel Line named its ships after characters from Greek mythology. Meriones was a warrior in Homer's Iliad.

A new class of Blue Funnel Line ships
Blue Funnel Line lost 16 ships in the First World War.

Blue Funnel ordered members of the new class from five different shipyards. Palmers Shipbuilding and Iron Company built two:  at Jarrow and Meriones at Hebburn, both launched in 1921.

Palmers launched Meriones on 19 August 1921 and completed her in September 1922. Like most members of the class she was powered by two steam turbines, which drove a single screw via double reduction gearing.

In 1934 Automedons code letters KMSP were superseded by the call sign GBCK, and she was fitted with wireless direction finding.

Second World War service
In the Second World War Meriones mostly sailed unescorted. In November 1939 she sailed in Convy HG 7 from Port Said to Liverpool. In May 1940 she sailed in Convoy SL 32 from Freetown in Sierra Leone to Liverpool.

Grounding
In January 1941 Meriones had partly loaded a mixed cargo for Brisbane, and joined a convoy heading from London to Hull on her way to load the rest of her cargo. Her cargo included cement, sodium nitrate, manganese, tinplate and a large quantity of cable and machinery. Also aboard were two racehorses owned by the Duke of Gloucester, who had recently been appointed Governor-General of Australia. Meriones complement numbered 101 including her Master, crew and passengers.

On 22 January 1941 Meriones struck the wreck of the cargo ship , which had grounded and sunk on South Haisborough Bank in 1932. Meriones became grounded upon the wreck, and her number six hold filled with water.

On 24 January Great Yarmouth Port and Haven Commissioners'  salvage tug Richard Lee Barber took pumps to try to refloat Meriones. Richard Lee Barber carried a salvage officer, Blue Funnel Line's marine superintendent, Captain Glazier, and Coxswain Henry Blogg of the Cromer Lifeboat, who had the best knowledge of Haisborough Sands.

Meanwhile German aircraft attacked Meriones. One attack was made as Richard Lee Barber approached Haisborough Sands, but was eventually repelled by gunners on nearby ships. An attack at 1415 hrs wounded one of Meriones DEMS gunners. Another attack at 1600 hrs dropped bombs which fell very near Meriones. German aircraft dropped a total of 23 bombs in three attacks on the ship.

At 1516 hrs the Cromer lifeboat was called.  was launched at 1534 hrs, commanded by Second Coxswain Lewis Harrison. She reached Meriones about 1830 hrs and went alongside Richard Lee Barber. Blogg rejoined H F Bailey and took Captain Glazier aboard Meriones. H F Bailey then stood by.

Rescue

The sea had been moderate, with an east-northeasterly wind. But now the wind increased and the sea started to break over Haisborough Sands. Meriones crew's quarters were awash, and the two horse boxes had broken loose. Meriones asked H F Bailey to rescue her crew.

H F Bailey positioned herself in the lee of Meriones and, after several attempts, was made fast to the ship with large ropes. She took half of Meriones crew to the Royal Navy tug Saint Mullion which was anchored nearby. H F Bailey took the 40 men to Richard Lee Barber, which was now at anchor within the sands.

Eight men now remained on Meriones: her Master and officers. The Duke's racehorses could not be rescued, so one of the officers shot them. H F Bailey took the last men off Meriones at about 0100 hrs on 26 January. H F Bailey was also carrying the ship's doctor from Meriones, and the gunner who had been wounded in one of the air attacks, and who was now on a stretcher.

There was now heavy rain mixed with sleet. Heavy seas were running both on shore and on the sand banks. In the darkness Blogg was uncertain of H F Baileys position, so Blogg took her to the deeper waters of Cockle Gat south of Haisborough Sands, and anchored for the rest of the night.

After five and a half hours it was light enough to fix H F Baileys position from the tower of the parish church of Winterton-on-Sea two miles to the south. H F Bailey weighed anchor and at 1015 hrs she reached Great Yarmouth to land the last 10 rescued men.

Loss of Meriones
During 26 January 1941 German aircraft attacked Meriones again, setting her afire. By 27 January she was beyond salvage.

Cromer Lifeboat crew

References

Bibliography

External links

1921 ships
Maritime incidents in January 1941
Ships built by Palmers Shipbuilding and Iron Company
Steamships of the United Kingdom
World War II merchant ships of the United Kingdom
World War II shipwrecks in the North Sea